Petley may refer to:

People with the family name
Frank Petley (1872–1945), British silent actor.
Roy Petley (born 1950), British painter.
Petley (1802 cricketer), a British cricket player.

People with the given name
Petley Price (1856-1910), British rugby player.

Place
Petley, Newfoundland and Labrador, a village in Canada.